The Papua New Guinea Post-Courier is a newspaper based in Konedobu, Port Moresby, Papua New Guinea.

It was established on 30 June 1969. Its parent company, The Herald and Weekly Times (later purchased by News Corp Australia), had acquired what had then been the two main newspapers in Papua New Guinea, the three-days-a-week South Pacific Post and the twice-weekly New Guinea Times Courier, and decided to amalgamate them into one publication. It was the first national daily newspaper in Papua New Guinea.

Luke Sela was editor from 1978 to 2000. 

With a circulation of 41,000, the Post-Courier is the largest selling Pacific Island newspaper. The paper is majority owned by Rupert Murdoch's News Corp. The Post-Courier's readership is mainly urban, and it is considered to be influential in the community.

See also 

 List of newspapers in Papua New Guinea

References

External links
www.postcourier.com.pg Post-Courier website

Companies of Papua New Guinea
News Corporation subsidiaries
Publications established in 1969
Newspapers published in Papua New Guinea
Port Moresby